Sheila Lukehart is an American physician who is Emeritus Professor of Medicine at the University of Washington. Her research covered immune responses and the pathogenesis of syphilis. In 2023, she was elected a Fellow of the American Society for Microbiology.

Early life and education 
Lukehart was born in Belleville, Illinois. She moved frequently as a child, and attended fifteen schools before ninth grade. She completed high school and college in Southern California. Lukehard studied biology at Revelle College in the University of California, San Diego, here she was first introduced to microbiology, and focused on Bacillus subtilis. She stayed in California for doctoral research, earning a PhD in microbiology at University of California, Los Angeles. Her doctoral research introduced her to Treponema pallidum and syphilis, which would fascinate her throughout her career. She returned to the University of California, San Diego as a postdoctoral fellow.

Research and career 
Lukehart joined the laboratory of King K. Holmes at the University of Washington in 1980, where she worked on sexually-transmitted diseases. In 2003, Lukehart was made Assistant Dean for Research at the School of Medicine. She dedicated her career to understanding syphilis. This included studies into how the central nervous system was involved with syphilis infection and the molecular mechanisms that underpinned the action of Treponema pallidum, the bacterium that causes syphilis.

Lukehart's early work defined the mechanisms responsible for clearing Treponema pallidum during the early stages of syphilis. Treponema pallidum is a complicated bacterium to grow; it is propagated by passage in rabbits and it has a very fragile surface structure. Lukehart identified that there was variation in the surface antigen of Treponema pallidum that could explain how it evades immune response and caused clinical infection. She studied the development of macrolide resistance in strains of Treponema pallidum, and showed that the bacterium frequently invaded the central nervous system in the early days of HIV.

Lukehart is a longstanding advocate for women scientists. She served on the national governing board of the Association for Women in Science, and founded the Seattle chapter. She retired from the University of Washington in 2020.

Awards and honors 
 2007 American Sexually Transmitted Diseases Association Distinguished Career Award
 2023 Elected Fellow of the American Academy of Microbiology

Selected publications

References

People from Belleville, Illinois
Living people
University of California, San Diego alumni
University of California, Los Angeles alumni
University of Washington faculty
Fellows of the American Academy of Microbiology
20th-century American women physicians
20th-century American physicians
21st-century American women physicians
21st-century American physicians